Pistacia chinensis, the Chinese pistache, is a small to medium-sized tree in the genus Pistacia in the cashew family Anacardiaceae, native to central and western China. This species is planted as a street tree in temperate areas worldwide due to its attractive fruit and autumn foliage.

Description

The leaves are deciduous, alternate, pinnate, 20–25 cm long, with 10 or 12 leaflets, the terminal leaflet usually absent.

The fruit is a small red drupe, turning blue when ripe, containing a single seed.

Taxonomy
Synonyms include: Pistacia formosana Matsumura; P. philippinensis Merrill & Rolfe; Rhus argyi H. Léveillé; R. gummifera H. Léveillé.

Some botanists merge Pistacia integerrima into this species as the subspecies P. chinensis ssp. integerrima, with the plants considered here then becoming the subspecies P. chinensis ssp. chinensis.

Distribution and habitat
It is found in Mainland China (excluding the far north and the far west) and Taiwan.

Ecology
Chinese pistache grows best in full sun, being intolerant of shade; it is the most frost-tolerant species of Pistacia, tolerating temperatures down to about -25 °C, yet it is most highly regarded in warm climates. It is planted for its impressive fall colors, which develop at least as far south as Orlando, Florida. In the low-elevation deserts of Arizona, it is the only tree whose leaves turn scarlet in fall.

Uses
It is a popular choice for street trees in urban settings because it is very drought tolerant and can survive harsh environments. It is also used as an understock for Pistacia vera. In China, the oil from the seeds is used for biodiesel production. The wood is used for production of furniture, and yields a yellow dye.

It is also used in classical Chinese garden design.

Gallery

References

Further reading

chinensis
Trees of China
Trees of Taiwan
Taxa named by Alexander von Bunge